Vallo della Lucania (commonly known simply as Vallo) is a town and comune in the province of Salerno in the Campania region of south-western Italy. It lies in the middle of Cilento and its population is 8,680.

History 
A settlement called Castrum Cornutum (meaning: "Fortress of Cornutans") is documented in the 13th century: according to the Italian historian Giuseppe Maiese, it had been founded by colonists from Cornutum, an ancient city in Dalmatia.
In the 18th century the town changed its name to Vallo di Novi. In 1806, during the French government of the Kingdom of Naples, it was made a district capital.

Geography 
The town is located in the middle of the Cilento and its National Park, close to Gelbison mountain.

The municipality borders with Cannalonga, Castelnuovo Cilento, Ceraso, Gioi, Moio della Civitella, Novi Velia, and Salento. The hamlets (frazioni) are Angellara, Massa, and Pattano.

Gallery

See also 
Cilento
Gelbison (mountain)
Gelbison Cilento (football club)
Roman Catholic Diocese of Vallo della Lucania

References

External links 

 Comune of Vallo della Lucania
Photos of the town

Cities and towns in Campania
Localities of Cilento